Halieutopsis taiwanea, also known as the Taiwan deepsea batfish, is a species of fish in the family Ogcocephalidae.

It is found in the waters of northeastern Taiwan.

Etymology
The specific name, which is an adjective, is based on the type locality off Taiwan.

References

Ogcocephalidae
Marine fish genera
Fish described in 2022
Taxa named by Hans Hsuan-Ching Ho